George Sellar VC (1850 – 1 November 1889) was a Scottish recipient of the Victoria Cross, the highest and most prestigious award for gallantry in the face of the enemy that can be awarded to British and Commonwealth forces.

Details
Sellar was approximately 39 years old, and a lance corporal in the 72nd Regiment of Foot (later The Seaforth Highlanders – Ross-shire Buffs, Duke of Albany's), British Army during the Second Anglo-Afghan War when the following deed took place on 14 December 1879 at the Asmai Heights, near Kabul, Afghanistan for which he was awarded the VC:

Further information
He later achieved the rank of sergeant. He is buried at Lairg Cemetery, Sutherland, Scotland.

The medal
His Victoria Cross is displayed at the Regimental Museum of The Queens Own Highlanders, Fort George, Highland, Scotland.

References

Monuments to Courage (David Harvey, 1999)
The Register of the Victoria Cross (This England, 1997)
Scotland's Forgotten Valour (Graham Ross, 1995)

External links
Location of grave and VC medal (Highland, Scotland)

1850 births
1889 deaths
British recipients of the Victoria Cross
Seaforth Highlanders soldiers
People from Banffshire
Second Anglo-Afghan War recipients of the Victoria Cross
British Army personnel of the Anglo-Egyptian War
British Army recipients of the Victoria Cross